John Charles Catarinich (13 November 1882 – 8 October 1974) was an  Australian rules footballer who played with the former South Melbourne club in the Victorian Football League (VFL).

Notes

External links 

1882 births
1974 deaths
Australian rules footballers from Melbourne
Footscray Football Club (VFA) players
Sydney Swans players